The Military District of Großwardein was one of the administrative units of the Habsburg Kingdom of Hungary from 1850 to 1860. The seat of the district was Großwardein (Nagyvárad, now Oradea). It included parts of present-day Romania, Hungary, and Ukraine.

See also
Administrative divisions of the Kingdom of Hungary

External links
Map
Map

1850 establishments in Hungary
Military units and formations disestablished in 1860
19th century in Hungary
Military history of Hungary
Oradea
1850s in Romania
Political history of Ukraine